The 2002 Eastern Illinois Panthers represented Eastern Illinois University as a member of the Ohio Valley Conference (OVC) during the 2002 NCAA Division I-AA football season. Led by 16th-year head coach Bob Spoo, the Panthers compiling an overall record of 8–4 and shared the OVC title with a mark of 5–1 in conference play. They were invited to the NCAA Division I-AA Football Championship playoff, where they lost to Western Illinois in the first round.

Quarterback Tony Romo's efforts earned him the Walter Payton Award given to the most outstanding offensive player in NCAA Division I-AA, now known as NCAA Division I Football Championship Subdivision. Despite not being selected at the 2003 NFL Draft, Romo later signed with the Dallas Cowboys as a free agent, eventually landing the starting job in 2006 season, and earned four Pro Bowl selections before his retirement in 2016.

Schedule

Roster

Game summaries

at Kansas State

Tony Romo was 13-14 for 120 yards and a TD in the first quarter, but Kansas State grabbed control and cruised to the 50-point win.

Team players in the NFL
No Eastern Illinois players were selected in the 2003 NFL Draft.

The following finished their college career in 2002, were not drafted, but played in the NFL.

References

Eastern Illinois
Eastern Illinois Panthers football seasons
Ohio Valley Conference football champion seasons
Eastern Illinois Panthers football